Sharif ol Din (also Romanized as Sharīf ol Dīn and Sharīf od Dīn) is a village in Beygom Qaleh Rural District, in the Central District of Naqadeh County, West Azerbaijan Province, Iran. At the 2006 census, its population was 90, in 20 families.

References 

Populated places in Naqadeh County